At the time of its merger into HOP!, Régional operated the following services (March 2013):

France
Ajaccio - Ajaccio Napoleon Bonaparte Airport
Bâle-Mulhouse - EuroAirport Basel-Mulhouse-Freiburg
Bastia - Bastia – Poretta Airport
Biarritz - Biarritz – Anglet – Bayonne Airport
Bordeaux - Bordeaux – Mérignac Airport
Calvi - Calvi – Sainte-Catherine Airport
Clermont-Ferrand - Clermont-Ferrand Auvergne Airport
Lille - Lille Airport
Lorient - Lorient South Brittany Airport
Lyon - Lyon-Saint Exupéry Airport
Marseille - Marseille Provence Airport
Metz-Nancy - Metz-Nancy-Lorraine Airport
Montpellier - Montpellier – Méditerranée Airport
Nantes - Nantes Atlantique Airport
Nice - Nice Côte d'Azur Airport
Paris - Paris-Charles de Gaulle Airport
Pau - Pau Pyrénées Airport
Strasbourg - Strasbourg International Airport
Toulouse - Toulouse – Blagnac Airport
Belgium
Brussels - Brussels Airport
Germany
Bremen - Bremen Airport
Hannover - Hannover Airport
Leipzig/Halle - Leipzig/Halle Airport
Nuremberg - Nuremberg Airport
Stuttgart - Stuttgart Airport
Italy
Bologne - Bologna Guglielmo Marconi Airport
Milan - Malpensa Airport
Rome - Leonardo da Vinci–Fiumicino Airport
Venice - Venice Marco Polo Airport
Verona - Verona Villafranca Airport
Netherlands
Amsterdam - Amsterdam Airport Schiphol
Slovenia
Ljubljana - Ljubljana Jože Pučnik Airport
Spain
Barcelona - Barcelona–El Prat Airport
Vigo - Vigo-Peinador Airport
Málaga - Málaga Airport
Sweden
Gothenburg - Göteborg Landvetter Airport
Switzerland
Geneva - Geneva International Airport
United Kingdom
Aberdeen - Aberdeen Airport

Lists of airline destinations
Air France–KLM